Liberty Township is an inactive township in Pulaski County, in the U.S. state of Missouri.

Liberty Township was erected in 1833, and named after the American concept of liberty.

References

Townships in Missouri
Townships in Pulaski County, Missouri